The 2015 Queensland Cup season was the 20th season of Queensland's top-level statewide rugby league competition run by the Queensland Rugby League. The competition, known as the Intrust Super Cup due to sponsorship from Intrust Super, featured 14 teams playing a 29-week long season (including finals) from March to September.

The Ipswich Jets won their first premiership after defeating the Townsville Blackhawks 32–20 in the Grand Final at Suncorp Stadium. Wynnum Manly Seagulls'  Patrick Templeman was named the competition's Player of the Year, winning the Courier Mail Medal.

Teams
In 2015, the competition expanded to the 14 teams with the inclusion of the Townsville Blackhawks. Townsville had previously been represented in the competition by the North Queensland Young Guns and Townsville Stingers.

The Canberra Raiders ended their affiliation with the Souths Logan Magpies, who partnered with the Brisbane Broncos. After four seasons without an NRL affiliate, the Sunshine Coast Falcons formed a partnership with the Melbourne Storm.

Ladder

Final series
The Queensland Cup reverted to a six-team finals format in 2015.

Grand Final

Townsville took out the minor premiership in their debut season, losing just three games (one of those to Ipswich). They qualified for their first Grand Final after defeating the PNG Hunters 26–12 in the major semi final. Ipswich, who finished the regular season in 3rd, defeated the Northern Pride 54–26 in the first elimination final. In the minor semi final, they defeated Easts and then upset the Hunters a week later to qualify for their third Grand Final.

First half
Townsville got off to a great start, scoring in the 2nd minute of the game through centre Tom Humble. Ipswich scored their first try in the 19th minute in spectacular fashion, when winger Marmin Barba ran 70 metres before finding his halfback Dane Phillips who scored. The Jets grabbed their second just minutes later when Townsville fullback Jahrome Hughes threw a wayward pass as he was being dragged over the sideline, that was dived on by Barba in the in-goal. Townsville hit back in the 29th minute when winger Zac Santo scored in the right corner. With a minute remaining in the half, Jets' fullback Carlin Anderson sliced through the Blackhawks defence off a scrum to give his side a 10-point lead.

Second half
It took just a minute before the Jets had their fourth try of the game, when captain Keiron Lander latched onto a Phillips grubber. Three minutes later they recorded their fifth try when centre Nemani Valekapa scored in the corner. The Blackhawks finally stemmed the flow of points in the 50th minute when Hughes crossed the try line. An Ipswich penalty goal from right in front extended their lead to 12 with 20 minutes to play. Townsville gave themselves a chance late when Robert Lui grubbered for himself to score in the 73rd minute to see his side trail by just six. A tense final seven minutes followed but Ipswich held on and sealed the win with an 80th minute try to hooker Matt Parcell.

The premiership was the first ever for the Jets, who had gone 30 seasons without success dating back to the Brisbane Rugby League competition. Ipswich second-rower Billy McConnachie was awarded the Duncan Hall Medal for the man of the match.

NRL State Championship

After winning the Grand Final, the Ipswich Jets qualified for the NRL State Championship on NRL Grand Final day. They defeated the Newcastle Knights, the New South Wales Cup premiers, 26–12.

Player statistics
The following statistics are as of the conclusion of the season (including finals).

Leading try scorers

Leading point scorers

QRL Awards
 Courier Mail Medal (Best and Fairest): Patrick Templeman ( Wynnum Manly Seagulls)
 Coach of the Year: Michael Marum ( PNG Hunters)
 Rookie of the Year: Aaron Rockley ( Wynnum Manly Seagulls)
 Representative Player of the Year: Shaun Nona ( Queensland Residents,  Easts Tigers)
 XXXX People's Choice Awards: Wartovo Puara ( PNG Hunters)

Team of the Year

See also

 Queensland Cup
 Queensland Rugby League

References

2015 in Australian rugby league
Queensland Cup